General Carrera Lake (Chilean part, officially renamed in 1959) or Lake Buenos Aires (Argentine part) is a lake located in Patagonia and shared by Argentina and Chile. Both names are internationally accepted, while the autochthonous name of the lake is Chelenko, which means "stormy waters" in Aonikenk. Another historical name is Coluguape from Mapuche, a derivative of this name is applied to Colhué Huapí Lake after Argentine explorer Francisco Moreno reached this lake in 1876 conflating it with Coluguape (General Carrera Lake).

The lake is of glacial origin and is surrounded by the Andes mountain range. The lake drains to the Pacific Ocean on the west through the Baker River. During the last glaciation the lake drained to the Atlantic through Deseado River.

The weather in this area of Chile and Argentina is generally cold and humid. But the lake itself has a sunny microclimate, a weather pattern enjoyed by the few settlements along the lake, such as Puerto Guadal, Fachinal, Mallín Grande, Puerto Murta, Puerto Río Tranquilo, Puerto Sánchez, Puerto Ingeniero Ibáñez and Chile Chico in Chile, and Los Antiguos and Perito Moreno in Argentina.

The area near the coast of the lake was first inhabited by criollos and European immigrants between 1900 and 1925. In 1971 and 1991, eruptions of the Hudson Volcano severely affected the local economy, especially that of sheep farming. A car ferry operates between Puerto Ingeniero Ibáñez and Chile Chico in the Chilean sector of the lake. The lake is known as a trout and salmon fishing destination.

Area 
In its western basin, Lake Gen. Carrera has  maximum depth.

Geology 
Preservation of younger lithostratigraphic units within the graben form reverse stratigraphy with older units exposed at higher topographic elevations to the south. The graben channeled mountain glaciers which formed terminal moraine helping to modify the present-day shape of the lake. The tectonic activity that formed the depression can be inferred to subduction of the triple joint that has occurred over the past 20 million years, as indicated by ripple marks in volcaniclastic sediments observed along the southern shoreline. There is some speculation on whether the tectonics and crustal heat flow in the lake area are influenced by the asthenospheric window that exists beneath the crust in this region of Patagonia.

The Marble Caves, Marble Chapel, and Marble Cathedral are unusual geological formations located on the shoreline midway along the lake's length. They represent a group of caverns, columns, and tunnels formed in monoliths of marble. The Marble Caves have been formed by wave action over the last 6,200 years.

Gallery

References 

Lakes of Santa Cruz Province, Argentina
Lakes of Chile
Lakes of Aysén Region
Argentina–Chile border
International lakes of South America
Cenozoic rifts and grabens